is a professional wrestling stable, mainly performing in the Japanese professional wrestling promotion World Wonder Ring Stardom and also in the Japanese independent scene. The stable is leaded by Alpha Female and also consists of Nanae Takahashi, Yuu and Yuna Manase.

History

Formation. Under Alpha Female's leadership (2022–present)

At Stardom in Showcase vol.2, a non-canon event produced by World Wonder Ring Stardom on September 25, 2022, the chief executive producer Rossy Ogawa was a victim of various "grim reaper masked silhouettes" who kept attacking him. For the event, he established Queen's Quest's leader Utami Hayashishita, Lady C and God's Eye's leader Syuri as his bodyguards. On the other corner, Yuu who was the first silhouette and unmasked at the previous Showcase event has also established two tag partners presented under the same masks. They were revealed to be Nanae Takahashi and Yuna Manase on the event's night as they succeeded in defeating Rossy's Bodyguard Army. Minutes later, a video of Alpha Female was played, showing her criticizing the current situation in Stardom as she was announcing her return to the company on October 23, 2022 for the IWGP Women's Championship tournament. Together with Takahashi, Manase and Yuu, Alpha Female officially formed the "Neo Stardom Army" unit and declared the destruction over Stardom's roster.

Nanae Takahashi and Yuu fought in the 2022 edition of the Goddesses of Stardom Tag League, participating in the "Blue Goddess Block" under the tag name of 7Upp where they competed against the teams of BMI2000 (Natsuko Tora and Ruaka), FWC (Hazuki and Koguma), MaiHime (Maika and Himeka), The New Eras (Mirai and Ami Sourei), 02 line (AZM and Miyu Amasaki), Kawild Venus (Mina Shirakawa and Saki), and wing★gori (Hanan and Saya Iida). Alpha Female unsuccessfully challenged Mayu Iwatani for the SWA World Championship at Hiroshima Goddess Festival on November 3, 2022. Takahashi and Yuu unsuccessfully fought Maika and Himeka in one of their Goddess Tag League matches on November 19, 2022, at Stardom Gold Rush. At Stardom in Showcase vol.3 on November 26, 2022, Nanae Takahashi and Yuu will teamed up with a mystery partner announced as the newest member of the stable and defeated Donna Del Mondo's Giulia, Thekla and Mai Sakurai in a casket match. The mystery partner's identity was not revealed at the show. Takahashi and Yuu began the night by defeating Saya Iida and Hanan in one of their tag league matches. At Stardom Dream Queendom 2 on December 29, 2022, Nanae Takahashi and Yuu defeated meltear (Tam Nakano and Natsupoi) to win the Goddess of Stardom Championship.

At Stardom New Blood 7 on January 20, 2023, Nanae Takahashi defeated Waka Tsukiyama. At Stardom Supreme Fight 2023 on February 4, 2023, Yuna Mizumori competed in a call your shot match for a championship of choice, and Nanae Takahashi and Yuu successfilly defended the Goddess of Stardom Championship against Maika and Himeka.

Independent scene (2022-present)
Due to every member of the stable being part freelancers, they use to compete in various of the Japanese independent scene and worldwide independent circuit promotions. At Wrestle Queendom 5, an event promoted by Pro-Wrestling: EVE on November 13, 2022, Yuu defeated Laura Di Matteo to win the Pro-Wrestling: EVE International Championship.

New Japan Pro Wrestling (2022)
Due to being a Stardom unit, the members often compete in New Japan Pro Wrestling related events. On the first night of the Royal Quest II event from October 1, 2022, Alpha Female teamed up with Kanji in a losing effort against Ava White and Alex Windsor. On the secind night rom October 2, she defeated Ava White in the first rounds of the inaugural IWGP Women's Championship tournament.

Members

Current

Timeline

Sub-groups

Current

Championships and accomplishments
 Pro Wrestling Illustrated
Ranked Takahashi No. 105 of the top 150 female singles wrestlers in the PWI Women's 150 in 2022
Pro-Wrestling: EVE
Pro-Wrestling: EVE International Championship (1 time, current) – Yuu
Pure-J
Pure-J Openweight Championship (1 time) – Yuu
World Wonder Ring Stardom
Goddess of Stardom Championship (1 time, current) – Takahashi and Yuu
Goddesses of Stardom Tag League (2022) – Takahashi and Yuu

See also
Donna Del Mondo
Queen's Quest
Cosmic Angels
Oedo Tai
God's Eye
Stars

Notes

References

External links 

 

Independent promotions teams and stables
Japanese promotions teams and stables
Women's wrestling teams and stables
World Wonder Ring Stardom teams and stables